Littlest Pet Shop is a toy franchise and cartoon series owned by Hasbro. The original toy series was produced by Kenner in the early 1990s. An animated television series was made in 1995 by Sunbow Productions and Jean Chalopin Creativite et Developpement, based on the franchise.

The franchise was relaunched in 2005 and there are currently over 3,000 different pet toys that have been created since. Hasbro, alongside various digital media developers, has produced video games for consoles such as the Nintendo DS, Wii and PlayStation 3. A second animated television series was produced by Hasbro Studios for Discovery Family, a U.S. cable network partially owned by Hasbro. This series premiered in 2012 and concluded in 2016 after 104 episodes.

Hasbro has created virtual pets to 'adopt' and play with online. These websites were Littlest Pet Shop VIPs, and Littlest Pet Shop Online. In 2010, Hasbro released their version of Blythe as a part of this toy line. A wide variety of Littlest Pet Shop products have been produced. The first series was created in 2005, the second release in 2008, the third release in 2012, the fourth release in 2014, and the most recent release in 2017. Around the world, they are known to have code toy numbers on either the side of them or the bottom, or otherwise have them on the box which it sometimes comes with the sticker. On November 15, 2022, it was announced Hasbro made a deal with Basic Fun! to relaunch the toys in 2024.

Kenner toys (1990s)

Introduced in 1992, each set comes with certain actions, such as a movable part. Most included magnets or simple mechanisms, such as flapping wings. This line is also often known by collectors as "Generation 1", as it is the first iteration of the toyline to be released.

The line includes:

1992–1994
Note: Sets produced in 1992 are depicted. The same set released in 1992 was also remade in 1993 with different colors. Other sets are also released in 1994.
 Li'l Paw Prints Pets – Choice of a yellow cat or a grey and white dog. They came on a molded plastic base that would hide a rolling stamper built into the underside of the pet. Either of the stamp ink colors can come in red and purple.

Ready to Go Pets
 Happy Puppy – A Dalmatian with a purple pet carrier, an ID tag, a newspaper, a food dish, and a magnetized red brush that, when moved in front of its stomach, causes its tail to wag (a revision in 1993 contained a black dog with a green brush).
 Hurrying Hamsters – Two hamsters with a clear container (yellow lid), an ID tag, a water bottle, a bag of paper litter, and a clear pink wheel. The curved hamster has a little weight in its belly—when placed in the wheel and the handle is turned, the hamster would move as if it were running in the wheel (the 1993 revision contained two-tone hamsters).
 Ticklish Toucan – A magenta toucan with green feet, and a light turquoise cage with lavender bars, an ID tag, a perch, a newspaper, and a food dish. Touching the toucan's head would cause her wings to flap (the 1993 revision had a red toucan).
 Color Change Chameleon – A green temperature-sensitive chameleon with a pink container (blue lid), an ID tag, a water bottle, and a desert background (the 1993 version had an orange chameleon).
 Bashful Bunny – A white rabbit with a light turquoise basket, an ID tag, a bunch of carrots, a bag of litter paper, and a food dish (green food). If the user pressed down on the rabbit's tail, her ears would twitch (the 1993 revision had a brown patched rabbit and a pink basket).
 Frisky Kitty – A black/grey cat with a pink carrier, an ID tag, a newspaper, a food dish, and a magnetized ball of wool (the 1993 revision had a cream-colored cat).

Pet Presents
 Cutesy Kittens – Golden and gray-white kittens (brown and calico respectively in the 1993 version). It contained a cat house (with a built-in litter box on the base), a food dish, a scratching post, and a magnetized toy mouse on a string. The golden kitten's head had a magnet in it and would bobble its head when the mouse was dangled in front of it. Pressing the gray-white kitten's tail would cause the arms to move up and down in a scratching motion.
 Mice – Three mice (two of which were magnetized, grey or white in the 1992 version, black-and-white with patches in the 1993 version). A terrarium with a landscape insert, a lid that could be flipped over to become a maze, magnetized cheese, a water bottle and a food dish.
 Turtles – Two turtles with a terrarium (green with blue shells in 92, yellow with purple and pink shells in 93), a water dispenser, a landscape with a palm tree, and a food dish. One turtle pulls head when moved and the other turtle walks when pushed along a flat surface.
 Playful Puppies – Two dogs (a white fluffy dog, a brown and white mutt; a grey-white splotched fluffy dog and a pure brown mutt in the 1993 version). It contained a large basket, a newspaper, a dog bone, a fire hydrant, and a food dish. Fluffy dog wags tail when head is pushed forward and mutt has a magnet, so it chases bone.

Cozy Home Pets
 Puppy Trio – A Poodle, a collie, and a black-and-white spaniel. It came with a doghouse with a fenced-in green grass base, a food dish, with mailbox, and a magnetized newspaper. Pressing the poodle's tail would make her scratch her ear, pressing the collie's tail would make him shake his paw and the spaniel's bobble-head was magnetized to play tug of war with the paper and bone (1993 version had beige poodle, tricolor collie and brown and white spaniel).
 Gerbils – Four gerbils, containing two yellow transparent plastic enclosures, connecting pipes, an exercise wheel, a food dish, a water dispenser, and a magnetic wand to move the gerbils through pipes (1993 version had clear plastic enclosures).
 Fish – A tank with colorful floating fish and seahorse, with temperature, aqua coral, brown treasure chest with opening lid and yellow treasure inside and shell hand-pump attached to aquarium with transparent tube. When the tank is filled with water and the hand-pump is pressed, bubbles come out of the treasure chest (1993 version had goldfish).
 Monkeys – A trio of monkeys, one scratching, one crouching and one standing, with a tree, two platforms, a tire-swing, a food and water bowl, and two bunches of bananas. When the scratching monkey's head is pressed it scratches stomach, crouching monkey is magnetized, so it chases bananas and standing monkey can cling to the tree branches and tire-swing (1993 version had tan monkeys).

Mommy and Babies
Each set came with 5 babies and a mother. Two of the babies had magnets inside and would suckle the mother and play with toys. Each set seems to have used multiple variations in colour.
 Mommy and Baby Puppies – Sheepdog mother and pups, with a bed, newspaper, food and water bowl, bone and fire hydrant.
 Mommy and Baby Kitties – Grey-or-white mother, kittens come in yellow, grey and white, with a platform with litter box, scratching post, food and water bowl, basket, and yarn.
 Mommy and Baby Bunnies – White or brown mother, brown, white and grey babies, containing a cardboard vegetable garden, grassy terrain with a hole, a basket, a bunch of carrots, lettuce, and a food and water bowl.

Playsets
 Pet Shop – It came with a variety of accessories and two caged lovebirds that would kiss when lever moved (the 1992 version is aqua, while the 1993 version is coral).
 Care Center – A veterinarian play set with a dog, a kitten, and numerous veterinarian pieces. It came with a white bed with an adjustable pillow angle, a aqua weighing table (with a removable meter and two drawers), a magenta x-ray machine with a blue "scanner" (which was a handle that turns the battery 'on' and 'off'), a white cast for the dog's arm, yellow tweezers, an aqua tray, a white-and-aqua syringe, white scissors, a square aqua canister, a yellow thermometer, a round yellow canister, an aqua bottle, an aqua blanket, x-rays (one for the cat, two for the dog) that are illuminated by an x-ray machine, a check-up list, and 5 Band-Aid stickers cut out. When the kitten is placed in warm water, the fleas disappear. The dog's arm is moveable, and the cast can be put on it.
 Kennel Playcase (1994) – A re-purposed pet shop play set, this set uses the same overall mold, but comes with different accessories and a differently shaped counter.

Beethoven's 2nd
Based upon the movie series, there was a number of playsets featuring the infamous Saint Bernard dogs with Beethoven and Missy with Tchaikovsky, Chubby, Dolly and Mo.

 Tug 'n Play Beethoven – Beethoven with wagon and turkey leg. Beethoven is magnetized, so he plays with the turkey leg.
 Nuzzletime Nursery – Missy, Tchaikovsky, Chubby, Dolly and Mo, with a piano, crib, slipper and overflowing extended food dish. Chubby and Mo have magnets and play with slipper and nurse from Missy.
 Puppy Pool – Beethoven, Tchaikovsky, Chubby, Dolly and Mo, with a yellow pool with a fish that squirts water, snorkel, starfish, two towels, dog shampoo, brush and inner tube. Beethoven squirts water when squeezed, Tchaikovsky shakes head when moved, Mo floats in inner tube and Chubby moves paws to splash when tail is pushed.
 Backyard Kennel – Beethoven and Mo, with a doghouse kennel, skateboard, frisbee with bite-mark, double food dish and green leash and collar. Beethoven wags tail when moved and pulls Mo on the skateboard and Mo can fit the leash in his mouth and can be pulled on the skateboard by Beethoven and can also fit the frisbee.

Pal Around Pups
 Splash Happy Puppies – Four dogs (Poodle, white dog, Golden Retriever and Pug), a bath tub, a bathroom counter and bathroom accessories. Poodle shakes head when tail is pressed, Golden Retriever's mud spots disappear when in hot water and Pug squirts water when squeezed.
 Prize Winning Pups – Four dogs (Scottish Terrier, Shih Tzu, beagle and husky), an awards stage, a carrier, and accessories. Beagle lifts ear off its eye when tail is pressed, Shih Tzu wags tail when pushed forward and husky chases bone.

1994

Splashtime Pets
 Swimming Ducklings – A mother duck with two ducklings, all magnetized, a bowl of food, and a pond. The ducks could be made to move in the pond by a magnetized wand.
 Deepsea Divers – A small tank with two separated sides that both have coral, one side is blue and the other is red with yellow coral. Hot water is supposed to go in the red side and cold water on the blue side to make the seahorse turn colors. There is an octopus that squirts water, a snail that moves with the magnet wand, a seahorse that sticks to the coral, a magnet wand and a box of fish food.
 Jump 'n Splash Frogs – Three frogs on lily pads, a tank with a catapult, a jar of frog food, and a frog jumping contest mat.

Chatter Pets
 Chirpy Tree Friends – A skunk, a raccoon, a squirrel, a tree, grass with butterflies, and a hanging food dish. Skunk has a sweet scent, squirrel has a posable tail, perches on food dish and squeaks by pressing the squeak button on tree base and raccoon bats paws when tail is pressed on.
 Chirpy Birds – Four birds (yellow cockatoo, two pink cockatoos, and lavender cockatoo) with a clear aviary with swing hanging from top and feeder. Mother cockatoo has a magnet so she "feeds" the baby, yellow cockatoo balances on swing and lavender cockatoo perches on feeder. There was also a button on the top of the aviary that would chirp when pressed.
 Purry Kittens – Three cats (calico cat, yellow cat, and gray cat), mouse and a kitty condo, dish of spilled milk, and a box that squeaked. Calico cat chases mouse, yellow cat chases tail when spun around and gray cat climbs up condo.

My Real Pets
 Playful Persian – Persian cat with a tunnel bed, purple food dish with food, aqua brush, pink yarn ball and gold trophy. Persian plays with yarn ball.
 Sleek Siamese – Siamese cat with a litter box, scratching post, bucket of spilled milk, pink lavender yarn ball and silver and blue trophy. Siamese chases tail when spun around.
 Clever Collie – Collie with a plaid cushion, glittery leash and collar, newspaper, pink food dish and green or aqua trophy. Collie shakes paw when tail is pressed.
 Fancy Poodle – Brown poodle with a blue cushion, glittery pink leash, gold food/water dish, pink bow and silver trophy. Poodle scratches ear when tail is pressed.
 Lively Shih Tzu – Shih Tzu with a bright pink basket with yellow cushion, glittery aqua leash and collar, gold fire hydrant, round food dish with food spilling and magenta trophy. When Shih Tzu is pushed forward, tail wags.
 Brave German Shepherd – German Shepherd with a glittery red dog crate with blue door, newspaper sticker lining the bottom of the carrier, glittery black leash, detachable collar, food/water dish with food, bone and green trophy. German Shepherd has a magnet, so it chases the bone.

Littlest Pet Shop Zoo (1993–1994)
Keep Me Safe Pets
 Jungle Bunch – An elephant, a panda, a leopard, and a parrot, with a zoo enclosure, a bowl of food, a coconut, and a branch of brown bamboo. The elephant squirts water out of its trunk when squeezed. The panda holds bamboo and raises it toward its head to "eat" when said head is pushed. The leopard bats the coconut when its head is pushed and the parrot flaps its wings when its head is pressed.
 Polar Pets – A polar bear, two penguins, and a seal, with an ice cave, a bucket of fish, and a fishing rod — the polar bear has a magnet in its head, and chases fish. Penguins have ball bearings on the bottom allowing them to "slide" down the iceberg and the seal flaps its flippers when the snowball on its nose is turned.

Nursery Pets
 Baby Tiger – A baby tiger and a baby cockatoo, with a zoo enclosure, a food bowl, and a ball-on-string. The tiger shares a mold and gimmick with the Jungle Bunch leopard.
 Baby Chimp – A baby chimp, with a zoo enclosure with a hammock, a baby's bottle, nappies, a doll, a blanket and a bunch of bananas — the chimp wets itself.
 Baby Zebra – A baby zebra and a baby mouse, with a zoo enclosure, a brush, and a bale of hay — the zebra has a gear hidden in its mane, which when turned caused one hoof to kick.

Playful Ponies
 Arabian Prancers – One black rearing Arabian, and one standing gray dappled Arabian. Comes with lavender fence pieces that attach together, bucket of hay, bale of hay, blue brush and comb, pink saddle blanket and brown saddle. Black Arabian can be posed on its hind legs and gray Arabian bobs tail when head is petted.
 Shy Shetlands – Shetland ponies, a mother and baby. Comes with four pale pink fence pieces that attach to each other, bucket of hay, bale of hay, brush, comb, bottle, and two saddle blankets. Mother and baby have magnets in their heads so they nuzzle each other.
 Indian Ponies – Two ponies, one palomino, one appaloosa. Comes with an apple, bale of hay, purple brush and comb, western saddle and red saddle blanket. Palomino has a magnet in its head so it eats the apple and appaloosa moves front leg when gear in mane is pressed.

Wilderness Pets
 Baby Bobcat – A baby bobcat, a cave, a food bowl, and a toy mouse on a pink string — Same as pet shop standing kitties, the bobcat has a magnet in the head and will follow the mouse.
 Desert Parakeet – A parakeet, a purple bowl of grey food, desert terrain in enclosure with a blue lid — the parakeet flaps its wings.
 Fearless Falcon – A tan falcon, with the same accessories as the Desert Parakeet — like the parakeet, the falcon flaps its wings when head is pushed.
 Honey Bear – A bear, a cave, an orange bowl of purple food, and a mug of honey that the bear can hold — like the panda, the bear raises the honey mug to "eat".
 Playful Sea Lion – A sea lion with a starfish on its nose, with an ocean platform with an island and a palm tree and bucket of fish. When the starfish is turned, the sea lion 'claps'.

Keep Me Safe Pets (94 release)
 Lion Family – Father lion, mother lion, cub and macaw, with a cave and tree, yellow and magenta foliage, yellow fruit that hangs from tree and steak. Cub nuzzles mother and perches on tree, father lion opens mouth when tail is pressed and macaw perches on cave or tree.

Play With Me Pets
 Mommy Hen – A hen with chicks in eggs with removable eggshell tops in her nest, that chirp when pressed. It also included a coop and a food/water dish.
 Baby Calf – A cow calf with red corral, bale of hay and bell. Its tail swishes when the head is petted.
 Baby Lamb – A lamb with yellow corral, feeder, removable woolly coat and flower wreath. Its woolly coat comes off and one part of the corral can be used a jumping fence.

Zoo Playset
 Playset – A beige carrying case, that folds open with two internal trees, two bright green leaf canopies; one fits on top of each tree trunk, a purple chest, accessories in yellow, aqua, or bright pink: two sacks, a small bale of hay, a bag of peanuts, a bucket of fruit, a bamboo stick, a bunch of bananas, and two fish.

Sparkling Ponies (1994-1995)
 Pinto Pony – A black and white pinto pony, comes with light peach fence piece, blue star-shaped hair decoration, aqua saddle blanket, silver bucket of hay and pink brush. Rears up on its hind legs.
 Crystal Pony – A lavender pony, comes with green fence piece, blue hair decoration, blue and pink saddle blanket, silver bucket of green hay and pink comb. It has a gear hidden in its mane, which when turned its front leg moves.
 Sky Blaze Pony – An orange pony, comes with blue fence piece, glittery star-shaped hair decoration, purple saddle with silver trim, silver bucket of green hay and red apple. It is magnetized, so it reaches the apple.
 Mystic Pony – A black pony, comes with yellow fence piece, magenta hair decoration, white saddle, silver bucket of teal hay and teal brush. When head is petted, tail bobs.
 Lil' Saddle Filly – A baby black pony, comes with stall on green grassy base, pink hair decoration, saddle, with pink trim, purple brush and mint green bottle. Baby pony kicks front leg when back leg is pushed.
 Lil' Wash 'n Pretty Filly – A baby yellow pony, comes with corral on green grassy base, teal hair decoration, teal saddle blanket with pink trim, pink sponge brush, teal bottle, and teal bucket. Can be used with any soap and pony bobs when head is pushed.
 Lil' Brush 'n Grow Filly – A baby pink pony, comes with pink corral on green grassy base, yellow blanket with pink trim, fancy purple brush, fancy light blue bottle, two bright pink ribbons, and pink hair decoration. Hair grows.
 Lil' Magic Drinkin' Filly  – A baby gray and pink pony, comes with blue house on yellow base, pink, teal and yellow blanket, fancy light blue brush, fancy light blue bottle, bottle with pink top with teal bow and purple bow. When head is lifted, milk disappears.

Sparkling Pony Pairs
 Prancing Parade Ponies – One brown pony and one orange pony with accessories. When ponies are petted, their heads bob.
 Champion Ponies – One gray pony and one peach pony, comes with two jumping hurdles and other accessories. Peach pony can be posed on its hind legs and gray pony has a gear hidden in its mane, which when turned caused one hoof to kick.
 Sweetheart Ponies – One gray pony and one white pony with accessories. Ponies nuzzle.
 Royal Carriage Ponies – One black pony, one brown pony and a terrier, with a carriage, harness, saddle and accessories. Black pony bows when pressed, brown pony pulls carriage when harness is attached and terrier rides in carriage.
 Ice Palace Ponies – One gray pony, white pony and cardinal, with an ice castle and accessories. White pony kicks front hooves when tail is pressed down.

Sparkling Pets (1994-1995)
 Fluffy Persian Kitty – A persian cat that comes with a bed, a gold food dish and glittery pink brush and comb. Flips tail when head is turned.
 Royal Bombay – A bombay cat that comes with a throne, a gold tray, a food cup with food, and silver crown with red jewel. Licks lips when tail is moved.
 Proud Crested Cockatiel – A cockatiel that comes with a gold cage, pink food container and lavender perch. Raises crest when tail is pushed.
 Silly Yorkie – A Yorkshire Terrier that comes with a bed with green cushion, purple detachable mirror and glittery pink brush, comb and hair bow. Hair and tail can be pulled to be longer or shorter.
 Needin' Feedin' Puppies – A poodle and brown puppy that comes with green bed, box of food and treat dispenser. When the puppies are pushed against the treat center, the food drops down.
 Hungry Kitties – A white cat and yellow cat that comes with blue cushion, butterfly toy stand and pink food and water dish. When the cats are pressed against the food dish, the food disappears and lever can be pulled to reappear.
 Suppertime Guppies – A purple and blue fish, yellow and orange fish and orange and pink fish. Comes with fishbowl with yellow castle and box of fish food. Purple and blue fish is magnetic, so it goes for the fish food.
 Thirsty Guinea Pigs – A gray guinea pig and brown and white guinea pig. Comes with glittery terrarium with removable peach lid, water dispenser with gold hook that latches onto cage, glittery refill water bottle and carrots. When the guinea pigs are pressed against the water dispenser, the water level lowers.

1995–1996
Kenner also produced sets in 1995 and 1996 ranging from "Shimmering Mer Pets" to plush "Dazzling Hair Pets", diverging further from their original pet shop sets.
 McDonald's Happy Meal – It included fantasy creatures, such as a unicorn and a dragon.
 Television Series – Featuring the characters from the animated Littlest Pet Shop stories.
 Mini Surprise Families – Polly Pocket-style sets of anthropomorphic animal families, 'Teeny Weeny Families' were made by Vivid Imagination for the UK and Australian market and re-branded by Kenner as Mini Surprise Families for the US in 1996.
 Star Styles Pet Salon – Dog and mouse. Comes with salon and accessories. When the dog is placed on the runway and the magnetic wand is moved underneath the runway, the dog "walks".

Sea World Stars
It featured several SeaWorld stars like Baby Shamu. It also includes O.P. Otter.
 Pete & Penny Penguin with Icy Igloo – Pete and Penny Penguin, with hat, scarf, igloo, and bucket of fish. Pete and Penny are magnetized, so they attach to "kiss".
 Baby Shamu with Seashell Cradle – Baby Shamu and starfish, with sandy platform with blue wave, seashell cradle and bucket of fish. Baby Shamu flips tail when fin is pushed.
 Sir Winston Walrus on Rocky Coast – Sir Winston Walrus and crab, with rocky platform and carton of fish. Sir Winston Walrus bobs head when pushed forward.
 Dolly Dolphin on Her Dancing Wave – Dolly Dolphin and snail, with blue wave on top of pink platform with a pink handle and peg and carton of fish. Dolly Dolphin twirls when placed on the peg and pink handle is moved from left to right and squirts water when squeezed.
 The Shamu Family Playset – Mama Shamu, Papa Shamu, Baby Shamu and squid, with rocky base with flat transparent top, pool with diving wheel in back base with a light up base, transparent blue wave-slide and carton of fish. Mama Shamu squirts water when squeezed, Papa Shamu opens mouth when dorsal fin is pushed and Baby Shamu and family can be attached to the spinning wheel to "dive" into the water.

Pets on the Move!
 Hop'n Hide Bunnies – Three rabbits (one black and white, a brown rabbit and white rabbit). Black and white rabbit's tail twitches when carrot is rubbed on its tummy, brown rabbit hops when back is pressed and white rabbit slides through tunnel and is pulled up on a platform when the attached carrot in the garden is pulled up.
 Garden Tag Pets – Sheepdog, cat and blue bird. Sheepdog chases cat and blue bird flies around on the birdbath, perches on top of birdbath and perches inside nest.
 Ride'n Slide Hamsters – Four hamsters (two brown and two gray). The brown hamsters can slide on the teeter-totter and ride on merry-go-round while the gray hamsters run in the ball, slide on the teeter-totter and ride the merry-go-round.

Pup 'n Kitty Clubs
 Clubhouse Kitties – A white cat, yellow and white cat, gray cat and two kittens. It also comes with light brown tree trunk with three branches, bright pink rubber tire swing on orange string (suspended from branch), three lavender platforms that rest on tree branches, bright pink yarn ball, oval-shaped yellow food/water dish with brown food, bright pink (or green) skateboard with green (or pink) wheels and blue and white striped house with blue roof. White cat climbs up a tree, yellow and white cat rides on skateboard, gray cat scratches when tail is pushed and kitten chases yarn.
 Fearless Friends Puppy Club – St. Bernard, Dalmatian, German Shepherd, white puppy and black and white puppy. Comes with blue awards stage, pink doghouse with purple roof, bone, red fire hydrant, plastic blue-ribbon collar, gold medal on string and purple raincoat with pockets and medical symbol (which fits St. Bernard). St. Bernard wags tail when pushed along ground, German Shepherd chases tail, Dalmatian raises one ear when tail is pressed on and white puppy chases bone.

Dressed 'n Ready Pets
 Kitty Goes Camping – A cat with fuzzy bright pink teepee with teal, black, and pink geometric patterns on outside, dark blue dish of spilled milk, blue fish on purple fishing pole and pink bandana. Chases after fish.
 Tutu Fun Kitty – A gray and white cat with green grassy base, beige gazebo with roses (attaches to base), glittery pink tutu, gold crown with red jewel and transparent red cup of gold food. Cat bows head when tail is pressed on.
 Let It Pour Pup – A puppy with blue wagon with gray handle and wheels, yellow sponge brush, orange food/water dish with light brown food, yellow hooded raincoat and bright green bucket. The mud on the puppy's feet disappears in warm water.
 Sweet Sleepy Puppy – A fuzzy puppy with pink bone-shaped sleeping bag, blanket, teal doll, lavender bottle, pink bucket and two newspapers. Puppy wets itself.
 Take Care Pup – Brown and white dog with teal bed and adjustable pillow with silver frame, white syringe with blue pusher, blue thermometer, transparent bottle with pink top and light pink pull-over hospital gown with pawprints. Liquid in the bottle disappears when flipped over.

Country Fun Pets (1995-1996)
 Mini Surprise Pets – These toys consist of carriers with a wheel that moves the pets when it is turned.
 Country Garden Nursery – Mother dog, puppy, mother rabbit, baby rabbit, and mother cat and kitten with floral scent. Comes with a swing, washtub, bucket and ball. When the mother dog's head is locked in the upright position and her tail is pushed forward, her head pops downward and nudges the yellow ball along a path toward the puppy, mother rabbit pushes baby rabbit on the swing and mother cat squirts water onto kitten through her paw when the washtub is filled with water poured from the bucket into the rain gutter and hole in gutter lets water drip into washtub.
 Perky Playful Bunnies – Yellow mother rabbit, pink, blue and purple babies. Comes with a flower garden and carrots. Mother rabbit is magnetized, so she cuddles the pink baby rabbit.

Newborn Families
 Puppy Mom & Dad with Magic Birthing Mommy – Mother and father dogs and two puppies with floral scent. Comes with purple house, a food/water dish and chew toy. When either of the puppies is placed in the mother dog's belly and her tail is pushed, the puppy pops out and the father dog plays tug of war with puppies.
 Kitty Mom & Dad with Magic Birthing Cozy – Mother and father cats and two kittens with floral scent. Comes with pink house and multiple accessories. When either of the kittens placed in the small lower compartment of the birthing cozy and the mother cat is pushed along a lever inside the cozy, the kitten pops out and the father cat's back legs move when he is pushed along the ground; he can carry the yellow kitten by placing the kitten's scruff in his mouth.
 Mommy Deer with Frisky Fawn – Mother deer, fawn and pink butterfly. Comes with grassy nest platform. When the mother deer's back leg is moved, she bobs her head to "nuzzle" her fawn, when fawn's tail is moved, it "nuzzles" its mother, and butterfly is magnetized so it attaches to the mother deer.
 Mommy Fox with Playful Pups – Mother fox, two baby foxes; one standing and one lying down and yellow glow-in-the-dark firefly. Comes with hollow log and accessories. When the mother fox's front leg is pressed backward, her head bobs and she "licks" her baby, standing baby fox's ears move when tail is moved, lying baby fox slides down and firefly is magnetized, so it attaches to the mother fox's tail.
 Mommy Swan with Snuggling Babies – Mother swan, two babies and dragonfly. Comes with blue pond platform and various accessories. The mother swan moves wings when head is pressed, the dragonfly is magnetized so it attaches to the mother swan's wing and when the magnetic wand is placed underneath the pond platform, the mother swan "swims".

Country Home Carry Case
 Playset – A house carrying case, with two basket beds, two bones, two leashes, two collars, double food dish, double scratching post, and wheel barrow.

Shimmering Mer Pets
 Kissing Sea Bunny – Mermaid rabbit and octopus. Comes with pink chest, magenta crown and orange shell mirror. Mermaid rabbit blows a kiss.
 Swingin' Star Sea Monkey – Mermaid monkey and crab. Comes with transparent green star-shaped case, bunch of bananas with seaweed, pink shovel with yellow seashell-shaped handle and aqua coral. When coral is hanged from the top of the case; the mermaid monkey swings on it.
 Ocean Goin' Guppy Puppy – Mermaid puppy and fish. Comes with boat, life preserver and wooden box. Mermaid puppy nods when its tail is pressed.
 Mommy Mer Catfish – Mermaid cat and mermaid kitten. Comes with transparent magenta shell case, pink or white shell cradle with attached teal blanket inside and white (or pink) shell bottle. Mermaid cat and mermaid kitten hug.
 Splash 'n Play Cat and Puppy – Mermaid cat, mermaid puppy, hermit crab and lobster. Comes with pink and aqua rocky/coral base and sparkling pink/aqua wheel attached to base. When knob is turned on the back, the wheel spins and when the switch is pushed, the lobster comes out.
 Prance 'n Play Seahorses – Teal mermaid pony, white mermaid pony and clam. Comes with purple rocky/coral base and purple sparkling wheel attached to base. When knob is turned on the back, the wheel spins.

Sparkling Pond Pets
 Water Garden Kitties – Brown cat, gray and white cat, brown and white cat and turtle. Comes with brush, food dish and garden base with elevated pond and other features. Brown cat waves tail when head is pressed down, gray and white cat chases flowers and turtle slides down tunnel underneath pond.
 Twinkling Sledding Party – White husky, gray husky, brown husky and rabbit. Comes with sled, comb, food dish, igloo, pond and snow-covered ground. The set has several battery-operated lights.  White husky pulls sled, gray husky spins around, brown husky chases snowflakes and rabbit rides in sled and slides down on the igloo.

Dazzling Hair Pets (1995-1996)
 Plush Dazzling Hair Pets – These plushes include a pink unicorn, pink cat, white dog, and white leopard that come with a brush.
 Tickled Pink Kitty – Magenta cat, comes with yellow lock of curly hair, aqua crown with pink jewel, fancy aqua comb, three blue plastic bows, purple plastic cushion with yellow tassels, mirror in yellow frame. Hair lock can be attached.
 Poof n' Pretty Skunk – Purple skunk, comes with white throne with aqua cushion, two pink plastic hair bows with elastic attachment, fancy pink comb and yellow crown/collar with pink jewel. The tail can be styled.
 Pink Puff Puppy – Pink and white puppy, comes with purple chest, fancy blue brush, lavender ribbon, jewel sticker sheet and pink crown/collar with blue jewel. Stickers can be stuck to its hair and can be styled.
 Fancy Curls Carousel – Bright yellow lion, comes with carousel with grassy base, pink carousel base with canopy, blue pole in center of carousel, blue pole-top, four purple seats hanging down on green rods from canopy, four purple fence pieces that attach to grassy base with four seats, purple combs, two with glittery heart stickers that can be attached to canopy, two circular purple hair decorations with hearts on them that can be attached to canopy, and two tiara-shaped purple hair decorations that can be attached to canopy. When blue knob on top of the carousel's canopy is twirled, the carousel spins around.
 Primpin' Guinea Pig Pals – Teal guinea pig and lavender guinea pig, comes with terrarium with green terrain inside, pink lid, gold hanging water dispenser with blue disappearing water, yellow comb and bunch of carrots. When the guinea pigs drink the water, it disappears.
 Fluffy Lil' Puppies – Yellow puppy and poodle, comes with purple basket with molded aqua cushion, pink bow that attaches to basket, fancy blue brush, and treat center. When the puppies are pushed against the treat center, the food drops down.
 Silky Lil' Kitties – Purple cat and pink cat, comes with plastic aqua bed with yellow trim, mirror in yellow frame that attaches to bed, blue brush and magenta food and water dish. When the cats are pressed against the food dish, the food disappears.
 Royal Palace Ponies – Yellow pony, pink pony, pink dog and magenta bird, comes with a transparent glittery blue castle, front white carriage with purple canopy and wheels, two blue, iridescent, snowflake-shaped hair decorations (one with rounded edges, one with sharp edges), iridescent white saddle blanket, aqua saddle, aqua harness with gold trim that attaches to carriage and fancy lime green brush. The yellow pony can pull the carriage when harness is attached and pink pony bows when pressed.
 Magic Waterfall Pets – Yellow deer, mermaid cat and fish, comes with a waterfall with pool on top and hidden room behind, fancy aqua comb, dark pink hair plug with pale pink curly hair, aqua hair plug with wavy magenta hair, magenta hair plug with curly green hair, along with pink and orange jewels with velcro on the back which changes color in warm water. The deer and mermaid cat's hair can be replaced and fish squirts water.
 Curly Tail Trio – Pink cat and two butterflies, comes with hair curler, comb and pearlized brown tree on green grassy base is that a panel of leaves folds down to reveal a room and a mirror in the trunk is revealed by turning a section of the bark. Cat and butterflies' hair can be curled.
 Puppy Dress-Up Palace – Orange dog and lavender puppy, comes with magenta palace with yellow top and bottom; two fold-out doors, fancy bright green comb, bright green barrette and gold cape. Lavender puppy's tail grows and shortens when crown is turned.

Hasbro toys (2005–present)
In 1985, General Mills spun off its Kenner and Parker toy divisions to form Kenner Parker Toys, Inc. Kenner Parker Toys was acquired by Tonka in 1987. Under Tonka management, Kenner Products was reconstituted as a division. Tonka (including Kenner) was purchased by Hasbro in mid-1991. Hasbro closed the Cincinnati offices of Kenner in 2000, and Kenner's product lines were merged into Hasbro's. This incarnation is also known by collectors as "Generation 2", and is considered to be divided into three parts.

2005-2006
The Littlest Pet Shop toy line had molds that looked more unrealistic compared to the 1990s incarnation of the franchise, and had realistic colors that blended in. They had bobble-heads  and they came with a round pink or blue magnet with a pawprint on it, this is located on the bottom of their feet (2004–2005 versions). Some pets were fuzzy. Later ones had a smaller blue magnet with no pawprint which didn't have a specified location on the bottom. This series of sets were released as single packages, in pairs, in packs of twenty, and with playsets.

2007-2008
The eyes changed to a glossy polish rather than with a matte polish as it was in G1. These pets have symbols in their eyes, such as a snowflake (chilliest), a diamond (fanciest), a cookie with a bite (hungriest), a raindrop (sportiest), a flower (cuddliest), heart (friendliest), mud splotch (messiest), clover (funniest), star (sassiest) and a wind symbol on some Comic Con-exclusive pets, although there were also glossy-eyed pets with no eye symbols. They also came in a more wide variety of colors, rather than just realistic colors. From 2008 onwards, the pets didn't have a magnet, but a circle with a shape of a hexagon inside the hole (except for birds with a rectangular slot for them to perch on playsets). A C-031 marking also showed up (except for birds). The most recent releases did not have the eye symbols, and had a redesign of the LPS logo. 

This era of the toyline also introduced video games developed by Electronic Arts and licensed by Nintendo, one game for the Wii and four versions for the Nintendo DS: Garden, Jungle, Winter, and Spring. Some releases for the DS came with exclusive pets.

2009-2012
In this era, the eye symbols were no longer used, and more bright colors were used for the color schemes of the figurines. This era also introduced collector stickers found in packs, and an even more variety of gimmicks, such as the Walkables, battery-powered figurines which can move at the push of a button, and the Blythe Loves Littlest Pet Shop line, which introduces Blythe as a smaller-scale doll which comes with a pet as part of a themed pack.

Even more licensed Nintendo games were released in this era. Littlest Pet Shop: Friends, released in 2009, came with both a Wii release and three versions of the DS release: City, Country, and Beach. In 2010 came the release of Littlest Pet Shop: Biggest Stars, which is exclusive to the DS and also came with three different versions: Blue Team, Pink Team, and Purple Team. Some of these releases also came with exclusive pets.

Generation 3
The line was revamped to coincide with the release of the 2012 TV series. The style and design of the toy pets was changed significantly, which garnered significant backlash from fans and collectors of the toys. Later on, they added the Sweetest Pets series (pets themed after sweets), Rolleroos (pet friends that are shaped like small balls), pets that came with Blythe, and the Fairies series. The pets now had different molds and a new eye style. Later on, Hasbro reissued the Totally Talented set from G1, and Blythe was also given a makeover. Hasbro received many complaints about the G3 line.

This iteration also introduced mobile games for the toyline, including one developed by Gameloft in 2012, which included the use of tokens which came in purchased packs of the pets and scanned to win prizes, and another, Littlest Pet Shop: Your World, which included the use of "zap codes", codes similar to QR codes which are found in the pets themselves.

Generation 4
These pets have molds that more closely resemble the style of the TV series and were given names. Hasbro released the Pets Pawsabilities collection during this time, and in 2016, the Pets in the City collection, which more closely resembles the pets released in G2. Due to popular demand and fan outcry over the G3 line, Hasbro brought the bobble-head pets back, which included pets from the 2012 TV show and used the same molds as the pets from the G1 and G2 lines. But it was also short-lived, as the bobble-head style was retired in mid-2014.

Generation 5
The Littlest Pet Shop toys were revamped in 2017, with new molds and rounded eyes similar to the second generation pets. Some of the toys released under this line include the Black and White Pop collection and the Rainbow collection. The pets in this line come in three sizes: teensie, mini, and classic (the largest of the three). It was also during this time that a new show premiered on Discovery Family called Littlest Pet Shop: A World of Our Own.

Media adaptations

Animation TV series and shorts

Littlest Pet Shop (1995)

Littlest Pet Shop (2012)

Littlest Pet Shop Presents
The animated shorts, produced by Cosmic Toast Studios, were released online by Hasbro.

Littlest Pet Shop: A World of Our Own

The 2018 animated series, produced by Hasbro Studios and Boulder Media Limited for Discovery Family. Its main cast includes a turtle named Bev (voiced by Rhona Rees), a cat named Jade (voiced by Ingrid Nilson), a dog named Roxie (voiced by Diana Kaarina), a hamster named Trip (voiced by Travis Turner), a goat named Quincy (voiced by Kyle Rideout), and a parakeet named Edie (voiced by Lili Beaudoin).

The series premiered on April 14, 2018 and ran for 52 eleven-minute episodes. The show was canceled after only one season.

Video games

Littlest Pet Shop (2008)

References

External links
 Official site
 

 
Mass media franchises introduced in 1992
Hasbro brands
Hasbro franchises
1990s toys
2000s toys
Toy brands
Toy animals